Tegic Communications, Inc. was a predictive text company based in Seattle, Washington, United States, founded on November 18, 1996. It was acquired by AOL on December 3, 1999, and subsequently, on August 24, 2007, acquired by Nuance Communications, whereafter it ceased to exist as a separate company. 

Tegic developed T9, the original predictive text software that is used for most mobile phones for text entry.

References 

Defunct software companies of the United States